Jerry Tucker (born Jerome Harold Schatz, November 1, 1925 – November 23, 2016) was an American child actor, most notable for having played the "rich kid" in the Our Gang short subjects series semi-regularly from 1931 to 1938.

Life and career 
Tucker was born Jerome Harold Schatz in Chicago, Illinois, the son of Ruth (Keno) and Leonard Schatz. His German Jewish surname was changed to "Tucker" for his acting career. Tucker first appeared in the 1931 Our Gang short Shiver My Timbers. He appeared in many Our Gang episodes and left the series after the 1938 Our Gang short Three Men in a Tub.

In addition to his Our Gang appearances, Tucker appeared in the Marie Dressler film Prosperity, again as a spoiled rich kid. He also appeared as one of Mother Peep's children in the Laurel & Hardy feature film Babes in Toyland (1934). He also appeared with Shirley Temple in Captain January in 1936, playing the "know-it-all" boy who forgets his answers on the test. On radio, Tucker played "the juvenile lead" on Jones and I, which was broadcast on CBS in the early 1940s and Roy Barry on the soap opera Hilltop House.

Tucker went on to serve in the United States Navy during World War II and the Korean War. During World War II, he sustained an injury that caused him to limp, when his ship was hit by a Japanese kamikaze. Afterwards he married Myra K. Heino and had a long successful career as an electrical engineer with RCA before retiring. His wife died in August 2012. Tucker died on November 23, 2016, of natural causes at Long Island State Veterans Home in Stony Brook, New York. He was 91.

Filmography

Radio

References

External links 
 
 
 
 
 Prosperity (1932)  Jerry played the part of Buster.

1925 births
2016 deaths
Male actors from Chicago
American male child actors
American male film actors
American male radio actors
20th-century American male actors
United States Navy personnel of World War II
United States Navy personnel of the Korean War
American electrical engineers
American male comedy actors
Hal Roach Studios actors
Our Gang
Engineers from Illinois
Jewish American male actors
21st-century American Jews